The outer root sheath or external root sheath of the hair follicle encloses the inner root sheath and hair shaft.
It is continuous with the basal layer of the interfollicular epidermis (skin).

References

Hair anatomy